Bradley Halliday (born 10 July 1995) is an English professional footballer who plays as a defender or midfielder for League Two club Bradford City.

He previously played for Fleetwood Town, Cambridge United and Middlesbrough, and had loan spells with York City, Hartlepool United and Accrington Stanley.

Early and personal life
Halliday was born and raised in Redcar, North Yorkshire. He attended Prior Pursglove College in Guisborough, North Yorkshire.

Career

Early career
Halliday had been playing for Redcar Town's youth team for 10 years when joining the Middlesbrough academy in 2010. He later returned to Redcar although Middlesbrough continued to monitor his progress. Halliday was spotted playing for Redcar by a Newcastle United scout before joining the club's academy in early 2013. He rejoined Middlesbrough after impressing their manager Dave Parnaby during a trial, signing a professional contract with the club in August 2013.

Having played regularly for Middlesbrough's under-21s in the 2014–15 season, Halliday joined League Two club York City on 14 November 2014 on a one-month youth loan to provide cover and competition for right back Marvin McCoy. He made his first-team debut in York's 3–2 home defeat to AFC Wimbledon on 13 December 2014, and having been named man of the match his loan was extended until 17 January 2015 two days after the match. He established himself in the team ahead of McCoy before receiving the first red card of his senior career for a two-footed tackle in York's 1–0 home win over Accrington Stanley on 26 December 2014. After serving a three-match suspension his loan at York was extended until the end of the season. Halliday scored his first career goal with an 85th-minute equaliser in a 1–1 draw away to Portsmouth on 2 May 2015 with a shot into the bottom right corner after capitalising on a slip from Dan Butler. He finished his loan at York with 24 appearances and 1 goal.

Halliday joined League Two club Hartlepool United on a one-month loan on 10 September 2015, as cover for the injured Jordan Richards and Michael Duckworth and the suspended Carl Magnay. He made his debut two days later in a 1–0 away loss to Exeter City, and finished the loan spell with six appearances. On 20 October 2015, he joined another League Two club, Accrington Stanley, on a one-month emergency loan, debuting the same day in a 4–3 home defeat to AFC Wimbledon. Having made 11 appearances for Accrington, his loan was extended for the rest of 2015–16 on 4 January 2016.

Cambridge United
On 31 August 2016, Halliday signed for League Two club Cambridge United on a long-term contract for an undisclosed fee.

He was offered a new contract by Cambridge United at the end of the 2018–19 season.

Doncaster Rovers

On 24 May 2019, he signed for League One side Doncaster Rovers on a two-year deal.

Fleetwood Town

Halliday joined Fleetwood Town on a two-year deal on 4 June 2021.

Bradford City 
Halliday joined Bradford City on his birthday – 10 July 2022 – on a two-year deal.

Style of play
Halliday plays as a midfielder or right back.

Career statistics

References

External links

Profile at the Cambridge United F.C. website

1995 births
Living people
People from Redcar
Footballers from North Yorkshire
English footballers
Association football defenders
Association football midfielders
Redcar Town F.C. players
Middlesbrough F.C. players
Newcastle United F.C. players
York City F.C. players
Hartlepool United F.C. players
Accrington Stanley F.C. players
Cambridge United F.C. players
Doncaster Rovers F.C. players
English Football League players
Bradford City A.F.C. players